Separation was a Swedish straight edge hardcore punk band from Umeå that existed between 1994 and 1999.

Band members

Final line-up
Axel Stattin ( Alan on Depression...) - bass (1994–1999)
Lars Strömberg (a.k.a. Lloyd on Depression...) - guitar, vocals (1994–1999)
Jonas Lyxzén (a.k.a. Tim on Depression...) - drums (1994–1999)

Past members
 José Saxlund (a.k.a. Cruiser on Depression...) - vocals (1994–1996)

Discography

Albums

Separation
CD Desperate Fight Records (dfr No. 19) 1997
 PunkRock Attitude
 Existence Precedes Essence
 Division
 Think...
 Another Silent Autumn
 Dumb, Dumber, Those In Command
 A Song For The Homeless
 Subjective Objectivity
 This World Is Ours
 FortySeven
 Ninethousand Lives
 The Victorious And The Dead

Separation (a.k.a. Phyte 10")
10" Phyte Records (Phyte Records No. 13) 1998
 Perspectives
 Random
 Bored Youth Theme Song
 Loud Way Of Saying Nothing
 Part Of The Show
 Possible
 Failure By Choice
 History In Fourteen Seconds
 Pleased, Comfortable And Satisfied?
 All For Nothing

EPs

5th Song
CD Desperate Fight Records (dfr No. 11) 1996
 Realm
 Funeral
 Ballgame
 5th Song
 On Their Behalf
 Critic

Demos

Separation
Cassette 1994

Depression...
Cassette 1995
 Empty
 Gone
 When The Day Comes
 Wither
 Can't Wait One Minute (CIV cover)

Splits

Separation / Serene
7" Genet Records (GEN701) 1997
 Pleased, Comfortable And Satisfied?
 Shape-Shifter
 Hey, There Must Be A Thousand Ways Of Killing Yourself Without Taking Someone With You

Separation / The (International) Noise Conspiracy
7" Busted Heads Records (no cat number), The Black Mask Collective (001), Trust No One Recordings (TNO008) 1999
 This Time I Will See The Story From Another Side
 No Schedule
 Bob Dylan Never Did Change The World
 Tell Me So I Won't Know

Compilations

Straight Edge As Fuck Part II
CD Desperate Fight Records (DFR No. 9) 1995
 When The Day Comes

Straight Edge As Fuck Part III
CD Desperate Fight Records (DFR No. 18) 1997
 Is It Over?

Still Screaming
CD Burning Heart Records (BHR 082) 1998
 Existence Precedes Essence
 Human Life Defined

Beat Us If You Can
7" Remaining Thoughts Records 1999
 Existence Precedes Essence

See also
 Straight edge

References

Swedish hardcore punk groups
Straight edge groups